The term collapsology is a neologism used to designate the transdisciplinary study of the risks of collapse of industrial civilization. It is concerned with the "general collapse of societies induced by climate change, scarcity of resources, vast extinctions, and natural disasters." Although the concept of civilizational or societal collapse had already existed for many years, collapsology focuses its attention on contemporary, industrial, and globalized societies.

Background 
It also started to become a movement when Jared Diamond's work Collapse was published. Since then, the term has gradually spread in the general English-speaking community, although it is still seldom used by the English-speaking specialists of the field. 

Collapsology is part of the idea that mankind impacts its environment sustainably and negatively, and propagates the concept of ecological urgency, linked in particular to global warming and the biodiversity loss. Collapsologists believe, however, that the collapse of industrial civilization could be the result of a combination of different crises: environmental, but also energy, economic, geopolitical, democratic, and other crises.

Collapsology is a transdisciplinary exercise involving ecology, economics, anthropology, sociology, psychology, biophysics, biogeography, agriculture, demography, politics, geopolitics, bioarchaeology, history, futurology, health, law and art.

Etymology
The word collapsology is a neologism invented "with a certain self-mockery" by Pablo Servigne, an agricultural engineer, and Raphaël Stevens, an expert in the resilience of socio-ecological systems. It appears in their book published in 2015.

It is a portmanteau derived from the Latin , 'to fall, to collapse' and from the suffix , logos, 'study', which is intended to name an approach of scientific nature.

Since 2015 and the publication of How everything can collapse in French, several words have been proposed to describe the various approaches dealing with the issue of collapse: collapso-sophy to designate the philosophical approach, collapso-praxis to designate the ideology inspired by this study, and collapsonauts to designate people living with this idea in mind.

Religious foundations

Unlike traditional eschatological thinking, collapsology is based on data and concepts from contemporary scientific research, primarily human understanding of climate change as caused by human economic and geopolitical systems. It is not in line with the idea of a cosmic, apocalyptic "end of the world", but makes the hypothesis of the end of the human current world, the "thermo-industrial civilization".

This distinction is further stressed by historian Eric H. Cline by pointing out that while the whole world have obviously not ended, otherwise we would not be here, civilizations have collapsed over the course of history which makes the statement that "prophets have always predicted doom and been wrong" inapplicable to societal collapse. Cline cites that while religious-type prophecies of physically unsurvivable apocalypses have been roughly evenly distributed across history, predictions about imminent societal collapse that it would be physically possible to survive (up to and including severities of the predicted collapse at which the ability to take the precautions required to survive contradicted the ruling elite's notions about human psychological nature) have almost exclusively been made when civilizations were in fact about to collapse. It is argued by Cline that this difference between religious-type prophecies of total destructions and predictions of survivable civilization breakdown is due to the fact that while cult leaders can profit more from offering salvation to people who think that everyone will soon die since it deceives the followers into thinking that they can give away all their money without earthly consequences, notions of civilization collapse that can be survived is an incentive to spend the money on preparations and survivalists have more important things to use their money for than giving them to a cult leader.

Scientific basis
As early as 1972, The Limits to Growth, a report produced by MIT researchers, warned of the risks of exponential demographic and economic growth on a planet with limited resources.

As a systemic approach, collapsology is based on prospective studies such as The Limits of Growth, but also on the state of global and regional trends in the environmental, social and economic fields (such as the IPCC, IPBES or Global Environment Outlook (GE) reports periodically published by the Early Warning and Assessment Division of the UNEP, etc.) and numerous scientific works as well as various studies, such as "A safe operating space for humanity"; "Approaching a state shift in Earth's biosphere", published in Nature in 2009 and 2012, "The trajectory of the Anthropocene: The Great Acceleration", published in 2015 in The Anthropocene Review, and "Trajectories of the Earth System in the Anthropocene", published in 2018 in the Proceedings of the National Academy of Sciences of the United States of America.
There is evidence to support the importance of collective processing of the emotional aspects of contemplating societal collapse, and the inherent adaptiveness of these emotional experiences.

History

Precursors (278 B.C.–2013) 
Even if this neologism only appeared in 2015 and concerns the study of the collapse of industrial civilization, the study of the collapse of societies is older and is probably a concern of every civilization. Among the works on this theme (in a broad sense) one can mention those of Berossus (278 B.C.), Pliny the Younger (79 AD), Ibn Khaldun (1375), Montesquieu (1734), Thomas Robert Malthus (1766–1834), Edward Gibbon (1776), Georges Cuvier, (1821), Élisée Reclus (1905), Oswald Spengler (1918), Arnold Toynbee (1939), Günther Anders (1956), Samuel Noah Kramer (1956), Leopold Kohr (1957), Rachel Carson (1962), Paul Ehrlich (1969), Nicholas Georgescu-Roegen (1971), Donella Meadows, Dennis Meadows & Jørgen Randers (1972), René Dumont (1973), Hans Jonas (1979), Joseph Tainter (1988), Al Gore (1992), Hubert Reeves (2003), Richard Posner (2004), Jared Diamond (2005), Niall Ferguson (2013).

Arnold J. Toynbee (1889–1975) 
In his monumental (initially published in twelve volumes) and highly controversial work of contemporary historiography entitled "A Study of History" (1972), Arnold J. Toynbee (1889–1975) deals with the genesis of civilizations (chapter 2), their growth (chapter 3), their decline (chapter 4), and their disintegration (chapter 5). According to him, the mortality of civilizations is trivial evidence for the historian, as is the fact that they follow one another over a long period of time.

Joseph Tainter (born 1949) 
In his book The Collapse of Complex Societies, the anthropologist and historian Joseph Tainter (born 1949) studies the collapse of various civilizations, including that of the Roman Empire, in terms of network theory, energy economics and complexity theory. For Tainter, an increasingly complex society eventually collapses because of the ever-increasing difficulty in solving its problems.

Jared Diamond (born 1937) 
The American geographer, evolutionary biologist and physiologist Jared Diamond (born 1937) already evoked the theme of civilizational collapse in his book called Collapse: How Societies Choose to Fail or Succeed, published in 2005. By relying on historical cases, notably the Rapa Nui civilization, the Vikings and the Maya civilization, Diamond argues that humanity collectively faces, on a much larger scale, many of the same issues as these civilizations did, with possibly catastrophic near-future consequences to many of the world's populations. This book has had a resonance beyond the United States, despite some criticism. Proponents of catastrophism who identify themselves as "enlightened catastrophists" draw from Diamond's work, helping build the expansion of the relational ecology network, whose members believe that man is heading toward disaster. Diamond's Collapse approached civilizational collapse from archaeological, ecological, and biogeographical perspectives on ancient civilizations.

Modern collapsologists 
Since the invention of the term collapsology, many French personalities gravitate in or around the collapsologists' sphere. Not all have the same vision of civilizational collapse, some even reject the term "collapsologist", but all agree that contemporary industrial civilization, and the biosphere as a whole, are on the verge of a global crisis of unprecedented proportions. According to them, the process is already under way, and it is now only possible to try to reduce its devastating effects in the near future. The leaders of the movement are Yves Cochet and Agnès Sinaï of the Momentum Institute (a think tank exploring the causes of environmental and societal risks of collapse of the thermo-industrial civilization and possible actions to adapt to it), and Pablo Servigne and Raphaël Stevens who wrote the essay How everything can collapse: A manual for our times). 

Beyond the French collapsologists mentioned above, one can mention: Aurélien Barrau (astrophysicist), Philippe Bihouix (engineer, low-tech developer), Dominique Bourg (philosopher), Valérie Cabanes (lawyer, seeking recognition of the crime of ecocide by the international criminal court), Jean-Marc Jancovici (energy-climate specialist), and Paul Jorion (anthropologist, sociologist).

In 2020 the French humanities and social science website Cairn.info published a dossier on collapsology titled The Age of Catastrophe, with contributions from historian François Hartog, economist Emmanuel Hache, philosopher Pierre Charbonnier, art historian Romain Noël, geoscientist Gabriele Salerno, and American philosopher Eugene Thacker.

Even if the term remains rather unknown in the Anglo-Saxon world, many publications deal with the same topic (for example the recent David Wallace-Wells' bestseller The Uninhabitable Earth, probably a mass-market collapsology work without using the term). It is now gradually spreading on general and scientific English speaking social networks. In his book Anti-Tech Revolution: Why and How, Ted Kaczynski also warns of the threat of catastrophic societal collapse.

References

Civilizations
Societal collapse
Secondary sector of the economy
Sociological terminology